Encore, released in October 2001, is the second album by British tenor Russell Watson. This album peaked at No. 1 on the US Billboard Classical Albums Chart on 18 October 2002.

Critical reception

The AllMusic review of Encore concludes with, "It's important to note that Watson did begin his career as a pop singer, but no one has ever straddled the great stylistic divide quite so successfully as he does on ENCORE."

Track listing

Musicians

Russell Watson – Vocals (Lead), Vocals (Background)
James Banbury – Cello
Jay Berliner – Guitar
Jeff Bova – Keyboards
Paul "Wix" Wickens – Keyboards
Neil Jason – Bass
Bashiri Johnson – Percussion
Steve Butler – Vocals (Background)
Rita Campbell – Vocals (Background)
Alistair Gordon – Vocals (Background)
Judith Abbott – Vocals (Background)
Sue Quin – Vocals (Background)
Laurence Cottle – Guitar
John McCurry – Guitar
John Parricelli – Guitar
Richard Cottle – Keyboards, Tin Whistle
Andy Findon – Whistle (Human)
Lulu – Duet Vocals on "The Prayer"
Lionel Richie – Duet Vocals on "Magic of Love"
John Lubbock – Conductor

Production

Leon Zervos – Mastering
Nick Patrick – Arranger, Producer
Russell Watson – Producer
Philip Bodger – Mixing
Jerry Clifford – Photography
Andrew Southam – Photography, Tray Card
Rory Johnston – Production Executive
David Maurice – Editing, Mixing, Programming
Mark Millington – Art Direction, Design, Photography
Mark Smith – Editing, Programming
Giles Stanley – Production Coordination
Bill Borrows – Liner Notes

Track information and credits adapted from Discogs and AllMusic, then verified from the album's liner notes.

Charts

Weekly charts

Year-end charts

Certifications

References

Russell Watson albums
2001 albums
Classical crossover albums
Albums produced by Nick Patrick (record producer)